Cristóbal Rojas may refer to:
Cristóbal Rojas (artist), (1857–1890), one of the most important and high-profile Venezuelan painters of the 19th century
Cristóbal Rojas Municipality, a municipality in the Venezuelan state of Miranda, named after the artist 
Cristóbal de Rojas (1555–1614), Spanish military engineer and architect